List of fatal dog attacks is a list of human deaths caused by dogs, worldwide. For information on causes of death and studies related to dog bite related fatalities, see Fatal dog attacks.

Fatalities in Australia

Fatalities in Canada

Fatalities in South Africa

Fatalities in United Kingdom

Fatalities in United States of America
 For years 2020 to current, see: List of fatal dog attacks in the United States

Fatalities in other countries

See also 
List of wolf attacks

References

dog attacks

Canid attacks